The Quneitra Military Council is a Syrian rebel coalition affiliated with the Free Syrian Army that was armed with U.S.-made BGM-71 TOW anti-tank missiles. It operates in the Quneitra Governorate. The group's leader, Brigadier General Abdul-Ilah al-Bashir was appointed the Chief-of-Staff of the Supreme Military Council (SMC) on 16 February 2014.

See also
List of armed groups in the Syrian Civil War

References

Anti-government factions of the Syrian civil war